Universal Wrestling Federation (UWF) was a professional wrestling promotion based in Marina del Rey, California from 1990 to 1996. Former employees in the UWF consisted of professional wrestlers, managers, play-by-play and color commentators, announcers, interviewers and referees.

Deceased individuals are indicated with a dagger (†).

Alumni

Male wrestlers

Female wrestlers

Midget wrestlers

Stables and tag teams

Managers and valets

Commentators and interviewers

Other personnel

See also
Universal Wrestling Federation (Herb Abrams) championships

References

External links
Universal Wrestling Federation alumni at Cagematch.net

Universal Wrestling Federation alumni at OWW.com
Universal Wrestling Federation alumni at Wrestlingdata.com

Universal Wrestling Federation alumni
Personnel